Yes or YES may refer to:
 An affirmative particle in the English language; see yes and no

Education
 YES Prep Public Schools, Houston, Texas, US
 Young Eisner Scholars, in Los Angeles, New York City, Chicago, and Appalachia, US
 Young Epidemiology Scholars, US

Technology
 yes (Unix), command to output "y" or a string repeatedly
 Philips :YES, a 1985 home computer
 Yes! Roadster, a German sports car

Transportation
 Yasuj Airport, Iran, IATA airport code
 YES Airways, later OLT Express, Poland

Organization
 Yale Entrepreneurial Society, US
 YES. Snowboards
 The YES! Association, a Swedish artist collective
 Young European Socialists formally ECOSY
 Youth Empowerment Scheme, a children's charity, Belfast, Northern Ireland
 Youth Energy Squad
 YES (Lithuania)

Literature
 Yes! (Hong Kong magazine)
 Yes! (U.S. magazine), a magazine focused on social justice and sustainability
 Yes! (Philippine magazine), a showbiz-oriented magazine
 Yes (novel), a 1978 novel by Thomas Bernhard
 Yes: My Improbable Journey to the Main Event of WrestleMania, by Bryan Danielson, also known as Daniel Bryan

Film, television and radio
 Yes (film), a 2004 film by Sally Potter
 yes (company), an Israeli satellite television provider
 YES Network, Yankees Entertainment and Sports Network
 Yes TV, a Canadian religious television system

Radio stations
 WTKN, formerly Yes 94.5, a radio station in Myrtle Beach, South Carolina, US
 YES 933, a Singaporean radio station

Music

Groups
 Yes (band),  English progressive rock band
 Yes Featuring Jon Anderson, Trevor Rabin, Rick Wakeman, a spinoff of this band

Musicals and operetta
 Yes, a 1928 libretto by Maurice Yvain

Albums
 Yes (Yes album), by rock band Yes, 1969
 The Yes Album, by rock band Yes, 1971
 Yes (Alvin Slaughter album)
 Yes! (Chad Brock album)
 Yes! (Jason Mraz album), 2014
 Yes! (k-os album), 2009
 Yes (Mika Nakashima album)
 Yes (Morphine album), 1995
 Yes (Pet Shop Boys album), 2009
 Yes! (Slum Village album), 2015
 Yes!, classical album by Julie Fuchs 2015
 Yes L.A., 1979 punk rock compilation EP
 Yes. (EP), 2021 EP by Golden Child

Songs
 "Yes" (Fat Joe, Cardi B and Anuel AA song), 2019
 Yes (Ben and Tan song), 2020
 "Yes!" (Chad Brock song), 2000
 "Yes" (Coldplay song), 2008
 "Yes" (LMFAO song), 2009
 "Yes" (McAlmont & Butler song), 1995
 "Yes" (Sam Feldt song), 2017
 "Yes!" by Amber, 2002
"Yes", by Beyoncé, from Dangerously in Love, 2003
"Yes", by Billy Swan, 1983
"Yes", by Black Sheep (group), 1991
"Yes", by Connie Cato, 1975
"Yes", by Demi Lovato, from Confident, 2015
"Yes", by The Family, 1985
"Yes", by Grapefruit, 1968
"Yes", by Jay & The Americans, 1962
"Yes", by Johnny Sandon And The Remo Four, 1963
"Yes", by Karl Wolf feat. Super Sako, Deena, Fito Blanko, 2019
"Yes!", by Kyle (musician), 2020
 "YES", by Louisa Johnson feat. 2 Chainz, 2018
"Yes", by Manic Street Preachers, from The Holy Bible, 1994
"Yes", by Merry Clayton, 1987 (from the Dirty Dancing film soundtrack)
"Yes", by Pet Shop Boys, 2009
"Yes", by Tim Moore, 1985
"Yes", from Maurice Yvain's 1928 musical, Yes

Other uses
 Yes Yes Yes (horse), Australian thoroughbred racehorse

See also
 
 Yesss (disambiguation)